Júlio Chaves (December 28, 1944 in Rio de Janeiro – August 10, 2021 in Rio de Janeiro) was a Brazilian voice actor who performed the Brazilian Portuguese language dubbing for numerous international actors and films. Chaves was the official Brazilian voice of several well-known film actors in releases in Brazil, including Rowan Atkinson, Andy Garcia, Mel Gibson, Dustin Hoffman, Jeremy Irons, and Tommy Lee Jones.

Biography
In films, Chaves notably provided the Brazilian voice of Marlin, the clownfish father of Nemo, in the Pixar films Finding Nemo (2003) and its sequel, Finding Dory (2016).

Chaves began his voice-over and dubbing career in the 1970s, eventually becoming one of Brazil's most prolific voice actors.

Chaves died from complications of COVID-19 in Rio de Janeiro on August 10, 2021, at the age of 76. His death was confirmed by his daughter, Juliana. Chaves' son, Márcio Chaves, who was also a voice actor, died in 2016.

References

External links

1944 births
2021 deaths
Brazilian male voice actors
Deaths from the COVID-19 pandemic in Rio de Janeiro (state)